Non-governmental organizations in Georgia, nongovernmental organizations, or nongovernment organizations in Georgia, commonly referred to as NGOs in Georgia, are usually non-profit and sometimes international organizations independent of governments and international governmental organizations (though often funded by governments) that are active in humanitarian, educational, health care, public policy, social, human rights, environmental, and other areas to effect changes according to their objectives and operate in Georgia.

List of NGO in Georgia

References

External links 
Cso.ge – Relevant information to non-profit legal entities, groups, and individuals interested in civil society activities

Geor
Organisations based in Georgia (country)